Joseph Philip Knight  (Bradford-on-Avon, 26 July 1812 – Great Yarmouth, 1 June 1887) was a British clergyman, singer and one of Britain's most popular song composers. He published over 200 songs, first under the name Philip Mortimer then under his own name.

Knight was the son of an Anglican clergyman, Rev. Francis Knight, and went to America in 1829 to sing and teach music. He set many of the lyrics of Thomas Haynes Bayly, and Thomas Moore wrote the words for him for "The Parting" and "Let's take the world as some wide scene".

Selected songs
"Of what is the Old Man thinking?"
"The Veteran"
"Days Gone By", 
"The Grecian Daughter"
"She Wore a Wreath of Roses"

References

External links
 
 

1812 births
1887 deaths
People from Wiltshire
19th-century British composers